Ön is a 1966 Swedish drama film directed by Alf Sjöberg. At the 3rd Guldbagge Awards Sjöberg won the award for Best Director. The film was also entered into the 1966 Cannes Film Festival.

Cast
 Per Myrberg as Count Magnus
 Bibi Andersson as Marianne
 Karin Kavli as Old countess
 Marian Gräns as Helen Andersson
 Jan-Olof Strandberg as Johannes
 Ernst-Hugo Järegård as Vicar Byström
 Anders Andelius as Boman
 Mona Andersson as Mrs. Eriksson
 Björn Berglund as Dr. Ernst Forsman
 Sture Ericson as Viktor Sundberg
 Stig Gustavsson as Öberg
 Agda Helin as Mrs. Sundberg
 Erik Hell as Pettersson
 Olle Hilding as Persson
 Victoria Kahn as Helen Andersson - child
 Åke Lagergren as Olsson
 Birger Lensander as Parish clerk
 Sten Lonnert as Eriksson
 Gösta Prüzelius as Berg
 Sven-Bertil Taube as Police officer
 Torsten Wahlund as Lind the farm-hand

References

External links

1966 films
1966 drama films
Swedish drama films
1960s Swedish-language films
Swedish black-and-white films
Films directed by Alf Sjöberg
Films whose director won the Best Director Guldbagge Award
1960s Swedish films